The Men's 20 km Race Walk event at the 1988 Summer Olympics in Seoul, South Korea had an entry list of 53 competitors. Three athletes were disqualified, while one walker did not finish the race. The race was held on Friday September 23, 1988.

Medalists

Abbreviations
All times shown are in hours:minutes:seconds

Records

Final ranking

See also
 1988 Race Walking Year Ranking
 1990 Men's European Championships 20 km Walk (Split)
 1991 Men's World Championships 20 km Walk (Tokyo)
 1992 Men's Olympic 20 km Walk (Barcelona)

References

External links
  Official Report

1
Racewalking at the Olympics
Men's events at the 1988 Summer Olympics